Vecpiebalga Castle, also called Piebalga Castle, is a bishop's castle in Cēsis Municipality in the Vidzeme region of Latvia.

See also
 List of castles in Latvia

References

External links 
  Piebalga Castle (ruins)

Castles in Latvia
Cēsis Municipality
Kreis Wenden
Vidzeme